Sunil (सुनील) is a first name for males, often found in the South Asian community. The Sanskrit word  means "dark", "very blue", and is also an epithet of Krishna.

Notable people 

 Sunil (actor), Indian Telugu film actor
 Sunil (director), Indian Malayalam film director
 Sunil Kumar Ahuja (born 1961), American scientist
 Sunil Ambwani (born 1952), Indian judge
 Sunil Ariyaratne (born 1949), Sri Lankan director, lyricist, poet and writer
 Sunil Barve (born 1966), Indian actor and producer
 Sunil Batta (born 1961), Indian cameraman, director, producer and scriptwriter
 Sunil Bohra, Indian film producer
 Sunil Chhetri (born 1984), Indian footballer
 Sunil Kumar Choudhary (1980–2008), Indian military officer
 Sunil Deshmukh (born 1958), Indian doctor and member of Legislative Assembly
 Sunil Dhaniram (born 1968), Canadian cricketer
 Sunil Dutt (1929–2005), Indian actor, director, politician and producer
 Sunil Edirisinghe (born 1949), Sri Lankan musician
 Sunil Gaikwad (born 1970), Indian politician
 Sunil Gangopadhyay (1934–2012), Indian novelist and poet
 Sunil Ganguly (musician) (1936–1999), Indian steel guitarist
 Sunil Gavaskar (born 1949), Indian cricketer
 Sunil Grover (born 1977), Indian comedian and actor
 Sunil Gulati (born 1959), American-Indian president of the United States Soccer Federation
 Sunil Handunnetti (born 1970), Sri Lankan politician and a member of the Parliament of Sri Lanka
 Sunil Hettiarachchi (born 1937), Sri Lankan actor
 Sunil Jadhav (born 1992), Indian cricketer
 Sunil Janah (1918–2012), Indian photojournalist and photographer
 Sunil Jayasinghe (1955–1995), Sri Lankan cricketer
 Sunil Jogi (born 1971), Indian poet and writer
 Sunil Joshi (born 1970), Indian cricketer
 Sunil Kanoria (born 1965), Indian entrepreneur
 Sunil Khan (born 1947), Indian politician
 Sunil Mahato (1966–2007), member of the 14th Lok Sabha of India
 Sunil Maitra (1927–1996), Indian politician and member of the 7th Lok Sabha of India
 Sunil Mittal (born 1957), Indian entrepreneur, philanthropist and founder and chairman of Group CEO of Bharti Enterprises
 Sunil Mukhi (born 1956), Indian physicist and theorist
 Sunil Narine (born 1988), Trinidadian cricketer
 Sunil Oasis (born 1973), Indian cricketer
 Sunil Padwal (born 1968), Indian painter
 Sunil Pandey (born 1966), Indian politician
 Sunil Babu Pant (born 1972), Nepalese politician
 Sunil Paul (born 1964), Indian entrepreneur
 Sunil Perera (1952-2021), Sri Lankan composer, guitarist, songwriter and vocalist
 Sunil Pradhan (born 1957), Indian doctor, neurologist, researcher and writer
 Sunil Prajapati (born 1994), Nepali politician
 Sunil Raoh (born 1980), Indian actor, lyricist and singer
 Sunil Santha (1915–1981), Sri Lankan composer, lyricist and singer
 Sunil Sawney (born 1962), English cricketer
 Sunil Shanbag (born 1956), Indian actor and screenwriter
 Sunil Shetty (born 1961), Indian film actor, businessman, entrepreneur and producer
 Sunil Tagare (born 1962), Indian entrepreneur
 Sunil Thakur (born 1984), Indian footballer
 Sunil Thapa (born 1957), Nepalese actor
 Sunil Vaidyanathan (born 1976), Indian photojournalist and photographer
 Sunil Valson (born 1958), Indian cricketer
 Sunil Kumar Verma (born 1974), Indian biologist, scientist and zoologist
 Sunil Wettimuny (born 1949), Sri Lankan cricketer

Fictional characters 
 Sunil Bakshi (portrayed by Simon Kassianides), a high-ranking member of Hydra in Season 2 of Agents of S.H.I.E.L.D.
 DI Sunil 'Sunny' Khan, portrayed by Sanjeev Bhaskar in the ITV1 drama Unforgotten
 Sunil Markesh (known as "Mobley"), from the television series Mr. Robot, played by Azhar Khan
 Sunil Nevla, from the cartoon Littlest Pet Shop

References 

Hindu given names
Indian masculine given names